Dreft is a laundry detergent in the United States, Canada, United Kingdom and other markets. First produced by Procter & Gamble in 1933, it was the first synthetic detergent. The Fairy brand of washing-up liquid and Cascade brand of dishwasher detergent are also sold under the name "Dreft" in some countries, including the Netherlands and Belgium. In Canada, the laundry detergent is sold under the brand name Ivory Snow.

Technology
Synthetic detergents represented an improvement in laundry washing because these synthetic materials are less susceptible to hard water.  The commercial availability of fatty alcohols opened the way for the production of the related organosulfate derivatives.  In Germany, BASF started selling FeWA, followed by Dreft in the following year.

Marketing
By 1947, Dreft dishwashing detergent was released. Since the 1940s, hypoallergenic formulations of Dreft ("Dreft Stage 1" and "Dreft Stage 2") have been advertised as an ideal laundry detergent for washing baby linens. The slogan for Dreft is "For a Clean You Can Trust". It is generally marketed to mothers of newborns.

See also 
 Fairy

References

External links
Dreft official United States website
Dreft official United Kingdom website

Procter & Gamble brands
Laundry detergents
Products introduced in 1933